Arraiján is the district (distrito) of West Panamá Province in Panama. The territory lies west of the Panama Canal bordering Panama City.
The population according to the 2000 census was 149,918; the latest official estimate (for 2019) is 296,188, with many suburban communities for commuting workers of Panama City. The district covers a total area of 418 km². The district seat is Arraiján city.

Administrative divisions
Arraiján District is divided administratively into the following corregimientos:

Arraiján (capital)
Juan Demóstenes Arosemena
Nuevo Emperador
Santa Clara
Veracruz
Vista Alegre
Burunga
Cerro Silvestre

Education

The Lycée français Paul Gauguin de Panama, a French international school, is in Panama Pacifico in Veracruz.

References

Districts of Panamá Oeste Province